The USA Rugby Super League, usually known as the Super League, is a defunct national rugby union competition which ran from 1997 to 2012, contested by nine clubs in the United States by its last year. In the 2013 season, it was replaced by the USA Rugby Elite Cup.

The Super League competition was sanctioned by USA Rugby, the sport's national governing body, and was the premier level of rugby union in the country until it was reformatted into the Elite Cup.

Created by the management of 14 of the best rugby organizations in the United States, the league's goal was to create a high level, national rugby competition in the country. The competition was contested annually starting in 2007, with the largest number of clubs to have competed in the league being 18, in 2007 and 2008. In the 2011 season, the 11 teams competing were divided into two conferences, Red and Blue. The league's 2012 and last season had 9 teams, again divided into Red and Blue conferences. Most of the remaining teams after the final Rugby Super League season in 2012 entered the USA Rugby Elite Cup competition.

Teams

History

Seasons 1997 to 2000
The Rugby Super League was created at a time when there was a need for expansion of the highest level of competitive rugby in the country. 1997 was subsequently the inaugural season of the competition. There were 14 teams competing, which were divided into two seven-team divisions, the Western-Pacific Conference and the Midwestern-East Conference.

The original competing sides in the 1997 season were; Belmont Shore RFC, the Chicago Lions, the Dallas Harlequins, the Denver Barbarians, the Gentlemen of Aspen, the Kansas City Blues, Life, Old Blue, Old Puget Sound Beach RFC, Old Mission Beach Athletic Club RFC, the Potomac Athletic Club RFC, Old Blues Rugby Club (CA), Golden Gate Rugby Club and Washington RFC. Aspen won the first championship, defeating Old Blue 22 points to eight in the final which was played in San Diego.

The following season in 1998, two more sides gained entry into the competition, Boston RFC and the Philadelphia Whitemarsh RFC. Both teams joined the eastern conference, which saw the Harlequins move to the Western conference. This expansion saw two fifteen-team conferences.

Seasons 2001 to 2007
In 2001 the competition became recognized as the premier club rugby union competition in the United States - becoming separated from USA Rugby Division 1. In 2002, the league expanded again, with the inclusion of New York Athletic Club, who gained entry through means of promotion and the Hayward Rugby, who formed a merger with the Old Blues Rugby Club (CA).

The 2002 season saw major changes to the competition, with the "east and west divisions" format being dissolved to form a national competition. The format reverted to the division-associated fixtures in 2005. Super League celebrated a decade of competition in 2006, with OMBAC defeating Belmont Shore 36 to 33 in the final which was held in Santa Clara, California. It was announced after the 2006 season that the Rugby Super League would be expanding from 15 teams to 18 for the 2007 season. Santa Monica Rugby and the Charlotte Rugby Club accepted invitations to join Super League, as did the Boston Irish Wolfhounds, who also finished runner-up in both Divisions I and III in 2006. The Chicago Griffins also joined to replace the Kansas City Blues, who self-relegated their club to the USA Rugby Division I men's club competition.

2008 to 2012: Contraction and demise
In the 2008 season ESPN Classic broadcast live the RSL final between NYAC and Belmont Shore.  It was a hard-fought match that saw NYAC winning 31–28 in sudden death.

In the 2009 season the league shrank, featuring 16 teams in two conferences. Philadelphia Whitemarsh, Washington RFC, and the St. Louis Bombers did not return to the competition, while Life University returned after a six-season absence.
Because of the ongoing economic crisis, before the 2010 season longtime RSL powers Belmont Shore decided to only compete in Southern California's Division I competition. In response to this, Santa Monica also decided to self-relegate, dropping the number of teams to 14. Because of the uneven conferences, Dallas was shifted to the Red (West) Conference.  In August 2010 the Boston Irish Wolfhounds, and Charlotte RFC also relegated themselves.

In the fall of 2011, PAC Rugby withdrew from the competition and the Utah Warriors, based in Salt Lake City, entered the competition.  The Chicago Lions and Utah Warriors withdrew prior to the 2012 season.  The Chicago Griffins announced their withdrawal following the 2012 season. With the exit of several teams over a number of years, the 2012 season was the last season for the Rugby Super League.

2013: Relaunch as Elite Cup

With eight teams remaining in two divisions, the RSL was relaunched as the USA Rugby Elite Cup for the 2013 season. The Elite Cup ran for one season before folding at the end of 2013.

Teams (2012)

Results (1997-2012)

Results by club

Notable players
 Dan Power — played for the U.S. national team

See also 
 Americas Rugby Championship
 Rugby union in the United States
 United States national rugby union team
 USA Rugby
 North America 4, predecessor to the ARC

References

External links 
 

 
Defunct rugby union competitions in the United States
Rugby union leagues in the United States
Defunct rugby union leagues
1996 establishments in the United States
2012 disestablishments in the United States
Sports leagues established in 1996
Defunct professional sports leagues in the United States